William Hare, 1st Earl of Listowel (September 1751 – 13 July 1837), known as Lord Ennismore from 1800 to 1816 and as the Viscount Ennismore and Listowel from 1816 to 1822, was an Irish peer and Member of Parliament.

Life
He was the second son of Richard Hare of Ennismore, County Kerry, and Catherine (also known as Margaret) daughter of Samuel Maylor.  An older brother, John, died unmarried in 1774.

In 1796, Hare was elected to the Irish House of Commons for Cork City, a seat he held only until 1797, and then represented Athy from 1798 until the Act of Union in 1801. The latter year he was raised to the Peerage of Ireland as on 31 July 1800 Baron Ennismore, in the County of Kerry.  In January 1816 he was created Viscount Ennismore and Listowel and on 5 February 1822 he was even further honoured when he was elevated to Earl of Listowel in County Kerry in the Peerage of Ireland.

Lord Listowel married, firstly, Mary, only daughter of Henry Wrixon of Ballygiblin, County Cork, in 1772. After her death in 1810 he married, secondly, Anne, daughter of John Latham, in 1812 or on 2 March 1815, Anne, second daughter of John Latham of Meldrum, County Tipperary.  
By his first wife he had:
Richard Lysaght, Viscount Ennismore (1773–1827) married Hon. Catherine Dillon, eldest daughter of Robert Dillon, 1st Baron Clonbrock
William Henry (1782–1848) married on 17 July 1806 Charlotte, only daughter of Isaac Baugh, leaving issue.
Margaret Anne (died 1835) married in 1799, Richard White, 1st Earl of Bantry
Mary (died 1841) married in 1803 Charles Morley Balders of Barsham, Norfolk
Louisa (died 1855) married in 1817 John Bushe, eldest son of Chief Justice Charles Kendal Bushe
Catherine (died 1864) married in 1808 Richard Maunsell (died 1819).

He died on 13 July 1837, aged 85, and was succeeded in his titles by his grandson William, his son Richard Hare, Viscount Ennismore, having predeceased him. Lady Listowel died in 1859.

Notes

References
Kidd, Charles, Williamson, David (eds.) Debrett's Peerage and Baronetage, London and New York: St Martin's Press: 1990.
Charles Mosley (ed.), Burke's Peerage and Baronetage (106th edition, 1999), vol. 1, p. 1734.

1751 births
1837 deaths
Hare, William
Hare, William
Members of the Parliament of Ireland (pre-1801) for Cork City
Members of the Parliament of Ireland (pre-1801) for County Kildare constituencies
Peers of Ireland created by George III
1
William
Peers of Ireland created by George IV